Samih al-Maaytah is the Minister of Information of Jordan.

References

Jordanian politicians
Information ministers of Jordan
Living people
Place of birth missing (living people)
Year of birth missing (living people)